Mala Alsheraian is a paralympic athlete from Kuwait competing mainly in category F33 shot and discus events.

Maha competed in the 2000, 2004 and 2008 Summer Paralympics always in the shot put and discus.  Her only medal success came in 2004 when she won a bronze medal in both the shot put and discus.

References

Paralympic athletes of Kuwait
Athletes (track and field) at the 2000 Summer Paralympics
Athletes (track and field) at the 2004 Summer Paralympics
Athletes (track and field) at the 2008 Summer Paralympics
Paralympic bronze medalists for Kuwait
Living people
Medalists at the 2004 Summer Paralympics
Year of birth missing (living people)
Paralympic medalists in athletics (track and field)
Kuwaiti discus throwers
Kuwaiti male shot putters